Rudolf Huna (born 27 May 1980) is a Slovak professional ice hockey forward who is currently playing for Diables Rouges de Briançon of the Ligue Magnus.

Huna is the older brother of twin hockey players Robert Huna and Richard Huna. He has played in the Slovak Extraliga for MHk 32 Liptovský Mikuláš, HC Košice and HK Poprad and the Czech Extraliga for HC Oceláři Třinec, HC Vítkovice and HC Karlovy Vary. He has also played in the Russian Superleague for HC Neftekhimik Nizhnekamsk, the Swedish Elitserien for Leksands IF, the Deutsche Eishockey Liga for Füchse Duisburg and the Kontinental Hockey League for HC Lev Poprad.

Career statistics

Regular season and playoffs

References

External links
 

1980 births
Living people
Slovak ice hockey left wingers
Sportspeople from Liptovský Mikuláš
MHk 32 Liptovský Mikuláš players
HC Neftekhimik Nizhnekamsk players
Leksands IF players
HC Oceláři Třinec players
Füchse Duisburg players
HC Košice players
HC Vítkovice players
HC Lev Poprad players
HK Poprad players
HC Karlovy Vary players
MsHK Žilina players
Diables Rouges de Briançon players
Slovak expatriate ice hockey players in Germany
Slovak expatriate ice hockey players in the Czech Republic
Slovak expatriate ice hockey players in Russia
Slovak expatriate ice hockey players in Sweden
Expatriate ice hockey players in France
Slovak expatriate sportspeople in France